Stress relief is the concept of relieving psychological stress. Stress relief may also refer to:

Stress Relief (The Office), a 2009 TV episode
"Stress Reliever", a track the 2012 Ne-Yo album R.E.D.
Stress management
Annealing (materials science), in metallurgy
Heat treating#Stress relieving, in metallurgy